Andrea Hlaváčková was the defending champion, but chose to participate at the 2012 Rogers Cup instead.

Romina Oprandi won the title defeating Anna Chakvetadze in the final 5–7, 6–3, 6–3.

Seeds

Main draw

Finals

Top half

Bottom half

References
 Main and Qualifying Draw

EmblemHealth Bronx Open - Singles